The 2021 FIM MotoGP World Championship was the premier class of the 73rd F.I.M. Road Racing World Championship season. Fabio Quartararo won his first world title, with five race wins ahead of securing the title in the third last race of the season. Quartararo became the first ever Frenchman to win the premier class title, which was also the first title for a non-Spanish rider since Australian Casey Stoner in 2011. The season also saw Francesco Bagnaia and Jorge Martín win their first premier class races. In the overall standings, Bagnaia secured second place and reigning champion Joan Mir secured third place, while Martín was named rookie of the year. Ducati secured the constructors' championship for the second consecutive season and the teams' championship for the first time since 2007. In total, eight different riders won Grands Prix during the season.

Six-time MotoGP champion Marc Márquez returned at the third race of the year after his arm and shoulder injury which had sidelined him from the 2020 season. Having initially struggled with the injury, the former champion won three races from summer onwards. It was also the final season of seven-time MotoGP title winner Valentino Rossi after 22 seasons in the premier class, as well as the final season in which a 500cc-era debutant participated in the premier class.

Season summary 
Joan Mir and Team Suzuki Ecstar began the season as defending riders' and teams' champions, respectively, while Ducati started as defending constructors' champion. Ducati and Yamaha became early season favourites after winning all of the first five races of the season (rounds 1-3 for Yamaha riders Maverick Viñales and Fabio Quartararo, rounds 4-5 for Ducati rider Jack Miller) and locking out all but one of the 15 podium positions between them. Perennial title favourite Marc Márquez made his return to the series at the third round in Portugal, after missing nearly the entirety of the 2020 season as well as the first two rounds in Qatar due to recovering from an injury.

By the sixth round in Italy, Quartararo became the first clear title favourite of the season after four consecutive pole positions and achieving his third win of the season, extending his championship lead to 24 points. Miguel Oliveira won the Catalan round during a three-race podium streak. At the German Grand Prix, Marc Márquez made his first return to the podium since the 2019 Valencian Grand Prix with a win, extending his unbroken streak of victories at the Sachsenring to 11 in a row, dating back to 2010 in the 125cc class. With his victory, Márquez ended Honda's longest win drought since their full-time return to the pinnacle of Grand Prix racing in 1982 at 581 days. At the Dutch TT, Quartararo claimed his fourth win of the season, extending his lead in the riders' championship heading into the summer break, with a 34-point-advantage over his nearest rival and compatriot Johann Zarco.

Returning from the summer pause in Styria, rookie Jorge Martín translated his second career pole position into his maiden race win in just his sixth MotoGP race start, and claimed the first victory for Pramac Racing since their entry to the class in 2002. During the pre-event press conference, Valentino Rossi announced his retirement after 26 years on the Grand Prix circuit, effective at the end of the season. At the Austrian Grand Prix, KTM rider Brad Binder took his second career victory in a flag-to-flag race in the rain, after electing to stay out on slicks with three laps remaining, while the other five riders of the lead group entered the pits to switch to wet tyres. At an unseasonably cold British round, Quartararo took a dominant win while his nearest rivals faltered, extending his championship lead to 65 points with six rounds remaining. Silverstone also marked the first career MotoGP podium finish for Aleix Espargaró and the first podium for Aprilia as a manufacturer in the modern MotoGP era.

In Aragon, Ducati factory rider Francesco Bagnaia led from pole position to take his inaugural MotoGP victory and shortened Quartararo's championship advantage as the Frenchman struggled with tyres, dropping from third on the grid to finish eighth. At Misano, Bagnaia repeated his feat to win from pole for the second consecutive race, cutting the Frenchman's lead to just 48 points with four rounds remaining. In Austin, Marc Marquéz topped the podium for the second time of the year, ahead of chief title contenders Quartararo and pole-sitter Bagnaia. With the win, Marquéz extended his dominance over the Circuit of the Americas, having won 7 of 8 total MotoGP visits to the track.

At the Emilia-Romagna Grand Prix, Bagnaia started from pole for the fourth consecutive race, while Quartararo started from 15th position after a difficult qualifying session. While Quartararo fought his way back into the top five, Bagnaia crashed from the lead with four laps remaining, gifting Marquéz his third win of the season. Ultimately finishing the race in fourth after a last-lap pass by Enea Bastianini, Quartararo was crowned the 2021 MotoGP World Champion. Quartararo became the first ever Frenchman to win the premier class title, as well the first non-Spanish champion for a decade, since Australian Casey Stoner in 2011.

With Márquez missing the Algarve Grand Prix from a concussion sustained in a training incident, his winning streak ended. Bagnaia led from pole position to claim his third win of the season. After Quartararo crashed out of sixth position, Ducati secured the constructors' title. The race ended with a red flag after a collision between Iker Lecuona and Miguel Oliveira. Bagnaia achieved his fourth victory of the season at the Valencian finale ahead of Martín and Miller in Ducati's first-ever podium lock-out, securing the team's championship for the Ducati factory team for the first time since 2007. 

In total, eight different riders won Grands Prix during the season, and fifteen different riders made it onto the podium.

COVID-19 pandemic 
As with the previous season, the 2021 championship was affected by the COVID-19 pandemic, leading to the cancellation or postponement of many races. As it became clear local pandemic conditions would not allow for a running of the Argentine or American Grands Prix as planned, both races were postponed and replaced with a second round in Qatar and a round in Portugal. The return of the Finnish Grand Prix was delayed by a further year, as Finnish race officials did not wish to hold their inaugural event without fans in the grandstands, and the race was replaced with a second round in Austria. The Japanese Grand Prix was cancelled due to the ongoing pandemic situation in the country and the resulting travel complications and logistical restrictions, and was replaced by the new date for the American Grand Prix. The Australian Grand Prix was cancelled in early July, due to the paddock's inability to meet the Australian government's requirement for a two-week quarantine for all foreign entries to the country, which would introduce too large of a disturbance to the MotoGP schedule. With a mid-summer resurgence of COVID-19 cases in Thailand, its Grand Prix, planned for mid-October, was also cancelled for the second year in a row. By mid-August, the rising number of infections in Malaysia caused the cancellation of the Grand Prix in that country (replaced by a second round at the Misano circuit), meaning no championship rounds would be held east of Qatar for the second consecutive year.

Teams and riders 

All teams used series-specified Michelin tyres.

Rider changes 
Valentino Rossi swapped seats with Quartararo, leaving the Yamaha factory team after 15 seasons over two stints with the team.
 Pol Espargaró moved to Repsol Honda after 4 years with the KTM factory team, replacing Álex Márquez, who moved to LCR under a Honda factory contract, in turn replacing Cal Crutchlow. Crutchlow joined Yamaha as a test rider, replacing incumbent test rider Jorge Lorenzo.
Miguel Oliveira moved from KTM satellite team Tech3 to the factory team. Danilo Petrucci replaced Oliveira at Tech3 after two seasons with the Ducati factory team.
Andrea Dovizioso left the Ducati factory team after 8 seasons with the team at the end of the 2020 season. On 10 November 2020, he announced his intentions to take a sabbatical for the 2021 season and focus on a return in 2022.
Both Pramac Racing riders Jack Miller and Francesco Bagnaia moved to the factory Ducati team. Johann Zarco (coming from Esponsorama) and Jorge Martín (promoted from Moto2 with KTM Ajo) replaced them.
Enea Bastianini and Luca Marini were promoted from Moto2 to Esponsorama Racing, replacing Zarco and Tito Rabat, the latter having his contract terminated prematurely for 2021 and moving to the Superbike World Championship.
Lorenzo Savadori was promoted from a test rider position to a race seat for Aprilia Racing Team Gresini, after Andrea Iannone received a four-year competition ban for a doping violation.

Mid-season changes 
 Stefan Bradl replaced Marc Márquez for the start of the season, as Márquez prolonged his recovery from his 2020 season-ending injury.
 Tito Rabat replaced Jorge Martín for the Spanish and French Grands Prix, while the rookie recovered from injuries sustained in a Saturday morning crash at the Portuguese round.
 Ducati test rider Michele Pirro replaced Martín for the Italian Grand Prix.
 Álex Rins missed the Catalan Grand Prix after suffering a broken arm prior to the race. He was not replaced for the round.
 Franco Morbidelli missed several races after injuring his left knee in a training accident. He was replaced by Garrett Gerloff for the Dutch round, Cal Crutchlow for the Styrian and Austrian rounds, and Jake Dixon for the British and Aragon rounds.
 Lorenzo Savadori underwent surgery after his crash in the Styrian round. He missed the succeeding Austrian round and was not replaced.
 Yamaha withdrew Maverick Viñales from the Austrian Grand Prix, citing "unexplained irregular operation of the motorcycle" during the Styrian Grand Prix. Yamaha subsequently terminated his contract on August 20, thereby removing Viñales' entry in the championship. He was replaced by Cal Crutchlow for the British and Aragon rounds. Franco Morbidelli was subsequently promoted to the factory team as their championship rider for the rest of the season and the future, reuniting Morbidelli with former Petronas SRT teammate Fabio Quartararo. Andrea Dovizioso eventually returned from his sabbatical and returned to MotoGP, replacing Morbidelli as SRT's championship rider for the rest of the season.
 Maverick Viñales returned to MotoGP from the Aragon Grand Prix onwards with Aprilia Racing Team Gresini, replacing Lorenzo Savadori as the championship rider for the remainder of the season, with Savadori returning to his previous role as the test/reserve rider. Viñales is contracted to ride for Aprilia in 2022.
 Maverick Viñales sat out of the Grand Prix of the Americas following the death of his cousin, Dean Berta Viñales, during the first round at Jerez in the 2021 Supersport 300 World Championship the previous week. He was not replaced for the round.
 Marc Márquez missed the Algarve and Valencian Grands Prix after suffering a slight concussion during training days prior the race. He was replaced by Stefan Bradl at Algarve, but HRC elected not to replace Márquez for the finale in Valencia.

Calendar 
The following Grands Prix took place in 2021:

Grand Prix locations

Calendar changes 
 The Finnish Grand Prix was due to be reintroduced to the calendar after a 38-year absence. The venue hosting the round was to be the new Kymi Ring, instead of the Tampere Circuit used in 1962 and 1963, or the Imatra Circuit which hosted the round until 1982. The Finnish Grand Prix had been included on the 2020 calendar, but the inaugural race was cancelled in response to the COVID-19 pandemic.
The Czech Republic Grand Prix was initially left off the provisional calendar, as the circuit requires mandatory resurfacing for safety compliance, and it was unclear if the necessary work could be completed in time for its typical schedule date in early August. The 11th round of the championship was therefore left open as provisionally pending. On 8 December 2020, Brno city councillors opted out of the 2021 calendar, citing financial difficulties due to the COVID-19 pandemic. It marked the first absence of a Grand Prix in Brno since 1992. The mayor of Brno hopes for the return of the championship in 2022.

Calendar changes as a reaction to COVID-19 pandemic 
With the uncertainty of the development of the COVID-19 pandemic, championship organizer Dorna elected in November 2020 to nominate three "Reserve Grand Prix Venues" which could be used in the event that local virus containment measures or regulations force the cancellation of a planned Grand Prix.
The Portuguese Grand Prix at Algarve had previously returned to the schedule as a replacement race for the final round of the COVID-19 shortened 2020 season.
The Indonesian Grand Prix was originally planned to be reintroduced to the main calendar after a 23-year absence before being designated a Reserve Grand Prix for 2021. The venue hosting the round would be the new Mandalika International Street Circuit, instead of the Sentul International Circuit used in 1996 and 1997.
A Russian Grand Prix would see the inaugural motorcycle Grand Prix in that country. The Igora Drive circuit would be used.
On 22 January 2021, Dorna significantly updated the provisional calendar including the following changes:
The Argentine and American Grands Prix would be postponed due to the COVID-19 situation in both countries, with potential rescheduling for the final quarter of 2021.
A double-header would open the season in Qatar on 28 March and 4 April, followed by Portugal as the third round.
The provisionally pending race created by the absence of the Czech Grand Prix was removed.
The potential Russian Grand Prix was removed from the reserve list, leaving Indonesia as the sole Reserve Grand Prix Venue.
On 14 May the Finnish Grand Prix was cancelled due to the COVID-19 situation, and the Styrian Grand Prix would replace it on the date of 8 August. It was also confirmed that the Indonesian Grand Prix would remain a reserve Grand Prix in the 2021 calendar, subject to circuit homologation.
On 23 June the Japanese Grand Prix was cancelled due to the COVID-19 situation, with the previously postponed Grand Prix of the Americas taking its place in the calendar. This also led to the postponement of the Thailand Grand Prix by one week.
On 6 July the Australian Grand Prix was cancelled due to the COVID-19 situation, with the Malaysian Grand Prix brought forward by a week to replace it on the date of 24 October. In addition, a new Grand Prix, the Algarve Grand Prix, was introduced, which is scheduled to be held on 7 November.
On 21 July the Thailand Grand Prix was cancelled due to the COVID-19 restrictions in the country.
On 19 August the Malaysian Grand Prix was cancelled due to the COVID-19 restrictions in the country. For its replacement, a second Grand Prix at Misano was introduced, having the same schedule as the cancelled Malaysian round.
On 11 September the final championship calendar comprising 18 Grands Prix was confirmed. The Emilia Romagna and Rimini Riviera Grand Prix returned as the second Grand Prix at Misano, now having the shortened name of Emilia Romagna motorcycle Grand Prix. The previously postponed Argentine Grand Prix was also cancelled.

Results and standings

Grands Prix

Riders' standings
Scoring system
Points were awarded to the top fifteen finishers. A rider had to finish the race to earn points.

Constructors' standings
Each constructor received the same number of points as their best placed rider in each race.

Teams' standings
The teams' standings were based on results obtained by regular and substitute riders; wild-card entries were ineligible.

Notes

References

External links
 

Grand Prix motorcycle racing seasons